Golden is a family name that can be of English, Jewish or Irish origin. It can be a variant spelling of Golding. It is also sometimes a given name, generally male.

Notable people with the surname Golden
Al Golden (American football) (born 1969), American college football coach
Andrew Golden, gunman in the 1998 Jonesboro, Arkansas school shooting
Andrew K. Golden, American investment manager
Anne Golden (born 1942), Canadian administrator
Annie Golden (born 1951), American actress and singer
Antonio Gandy-Golden (born 1998), American football player
Arthur Golden (born 1956), American novelist, author of Memoirs of a Geisha
Christopher Golden (born 1967), American author of horror, fantasy, and suspense novels
Daniel Golden, American journalist
Dave Golden, American musician and Fulbright Scholar
Diana Golden (actress)
Diana Golden (skier) (1963–2001), American disabled ski racer
Eddie Golden, stage name for American professional wrestler Harold Edward Cox (born 1973)
Eve Golden, American film journalist and biographer
Grace Golden (1904–1993), English illustrator and historian
Grant Golden (tennis) (1929-2018), American tennis player
Grant Golden (basketball) (born 1998), American basketball player
Harry Golden (1902–1981), American writer and publisher
Howard Golden, New York Democratic politician
James S. Golden (1891–1971), US Representative from Kentucky
Jane Golden, American mural artist
Jared Golden (born 1982), US Representative from Maine
Jason Golden (born 1985), British rugby league player
Jerry Golden (1923–2003), American broadcaster
Jimmy Golden (born 1950), American professional wrestler
John Golden (pirate) (died 1694), English pirate
Johnny Golden (1896–1936), American golfer
Justin and Tasha Golden, members of Ellery (duo), a Cincinnati-based musical group
Lotti Golden American singer-songwriter, record producer and poet 
Martin Golden, New York state senator
Marvin Golden, British rugby league player
Maurice Golden, Scottish politician
Michael Golden (businessman), US newspaper publisher
Mike Golden (baseball) (1851–1929), American professional baseball player
Peter Allen Golden (born 1953), author
Peter Benjamin Golden (born 1941), professor of history at Rutgers University
Pop Golden, head football coach at Penn State University (1900-02)
Rena Golden (1961–2013), American journalist
Rolland Golden (1931–2019), American artist
Ronnie Golden, British singer, guitarist and comedian
Sherita Hill Golden,  American physician 
Sterling Golden, early stage name for American professional wrestler Hulk Hogan (born 1953)
Thelma Golden (born 1965), director of The Studio Museum in Harlem, New York City
Thelma Golden (softball) (1915–1980), Canadian softball pitcher
Thomas L. Golden, American 19th-century gold miner
Vicki Golden (born 1992), American motocross rider
William Lee Golden, American country and gospel musician

Notable people with the given name Golden
 Golden Brooks (born 1970), American actress
 Golden Cañedo (born 2002), Filipina singer and performer
 Golden Frinks (1920-2004), African-American civil rights activist
 Golden Richards (born 1950), American football player
 Golden Tate (born 1988), American football player
 Golden J. Zenon Jr. (1929–2006), African-American architect
J. Golden Kimball (born 1853), American religious leader and missionary.